Schleswig-Holsteinischer Zeitungsverlag ("Schleswig-Holstein Newspaper publisher"), sh:z, is a newspaper group based in Flensburg, Schleswig-Holstein. With 22 daily newspapers, the group is the largest daily publisher in the state. sh:z's publications have a circulation of over 150,000 with readership of about half a million people. The website SHZ.de carries news stories from the group's newspapers.

Titles
 Eckernförder Zeitung
 Flensburger Tageblatt
 Holsteinischer Courier
 Husumer Nachrichten
 Der Insel-Bote
 Schleswig-Holsteinische Landeszeitung
 Norddeutsche Rundschau
 Nordfriesland Tageblatt
 Ostholsteiner Anzeiger
 Schleswiger Nachrichten
 Schlei-Bote
 Stormarner Tageblatt
 Sylter Rundschau
 Wilstersche Zeitung
 Pinneberger Tageblatt
 Quickborner Tageblatt
 Schenefelder Tageblatt
 Wedel-Schulauer Tageblatt
 Barmstedter Zeitung
 Elmshorner Nachrichten
 Glückstädter Fortuna

References

External links

Newspaper companies of Germany
German news websites